John Richard Moore Jr. (September 12, 1925 – September 7, 2015) was an American actor known professionally as Dickie Moore, he was one of the last surviving actors to have appeared in silent film. A busy and popular actor during his childhood and youth, he appeared in over 100 films until the early 1950s. Among his most notable appearances were the Our Gang series and films such as Oliver Twist, Blonde Venus, Sergeant York, Out of the Past and Eight Iron Men.

Career

Moore was born in Los Angeles, California, the son of Nora Eileen (Orr) and John Richard Moore Sr., a banker. His mother was Irish, and his paternal grandparents were from England and Ireland. 

He made his film debut in 1927 in the silent film The Beloved Rogue, where he portrayed silent film star John Barrymore's character as a one-year-old baby. At the time of his death, Moore was one of the last surviving actors to have appeared in silent film. He quickly gained notable supporting roles. He had a significant role as Marlene Dietrich's son in Josef von Sternberg's drama Blonde Venus (1932). He also appeared with Barbara Stanwyck in So Big (1932), with Walter Huston in Gabriel Over the White House (1933) and with Spencer Tracy in Man's Castle (1933).

Besides appearing in a number of major feature films, he was featured as a regular in the Our Gang series during the 1932–1933 season. Although he only played in eight Our Gang films, in those films he played an important role as the leader of the gang. He left the series after one year to play in more feature films. In addition to his Our Gang work, Moore is most remembered for his portrayal of the title character in the 1933 adaptation of Charles Dickens' Oliver Twist. 

In 1935, he played the historical role of Joseph Meister in The Story of Louis Pasteur. In 1941, he portrayed the brother of Gary Cooper in the war drama Sergeant York under the direction of Howard Hawks. He is also famous for giving Shirley Temple her first romantic onscreen kiss, in the film Miss Annie Rooney.

Moore served in the United States Army during World War II.

Moore was less successful as a teenage actor and young adult and he often had to play in B-movies such as Dangerous Years during the 1940s. One of his last notable film roles was in Out of the Past (1947), in which he portrayed Robert Mitchum's deaf young assistant, "The Kid". Moore played his last role as a young soldier in Eight Iron Men (1952). He later performed on Broadway, in stock and on television. He went on to teach and write books about acting, edit Equity News, and produce an Oscar-nominated short film (The Boy and the Eagle), and industrial films. He retired from acting in the late 1950s. 

In 1966, after battling alcohol and drug addictions, he founded a public relations firm, Dick Moore and Associates, which he ran until 2010.

Personal life
Moore was married three times. His first marriage was from 1948 to 1954 to Pat Dempsey. The couple had one child, Kevin Moore. His second marriage was in 1959 to Eleanor Donhowe Fitzpatrick. His third and final marriage was in 1988 to Jane Powell, to whom he remained married until his death in 2015.

Later life

In 1984, Moore published Twinkle, Twinkle, Little Star (But Don't Have Sex or Take the Car), a book about his and others' experiences as child actors. Moore owned a public relations firm, Dick Moore and Associates.  Founded in 1966, it existed for 44 years. From 1988 until his death in 2015 Moore was married to the actress Jane Powell.  The two met when Moore interviewed Powell for Twinkle, Twinkle, Little Star.  The couple lived in Manhattan and Wilton, Connecticut.

In March 2013, Powell reported that Moore had arthritis and "bouts of dementia".

Death
Moore died at a hospice in Wilton, Connecticut on September 7, 2015, five days before his 90th birthday. He was later cremated and his ashes returned to his family.

Filmography

The Beloved Rogue (1927) as Baby Francois (film debut, uncredited)
Object: Alimony (1928) as Jimmy Rutledge Jr. (as Dickey Moore)
Madame X (1929) as Boy at Puppet Show (uncredited)
Son of the Gods (1930) as Sam Lee – as a Boy (uncredited)
The Three Sisters (1930) as The Child (uncredited)
Let Us Be Gay (1930) as Young Bobby Brown (uncredited)
The Matrimonial Bed (1930) as One of Susan's Sons (uncredited)
Lawful Larceny (1930) as The Dorsey Child (uncredited)
The Office Wife (1930) as Dickie – Boy at the Beach (uncredited)
Passion Flower (1930) as Tommy Wallace
Aloha (1931) as Junior Bradford
Seed (1931) as Johnny Carter as a Child
Three Who Loved (1931) as Sonny Hanson
Confessions of a Co-Ed (1931) as Patricia's Son (uncredited)
The Star Witness (1931) as Ned Leeds
The Squaw Man (1931) as Little Hal
Sob Sister (1931) as Kidnapped Boy (uncredited)
Husband's Holiday (1931) as Philip Boyd
Manhattan Parade (1931) as Junior Roberts
Union Depot (1932) as Little Boy (uncredited)
Fireman, Save My Child (1932) as Herbie (uncredited)
The Expert (1932) as Dickie
Disorderly Conduct (1932) as Jimmy
So Big! (1932) as Dirk De Jong (younger)
When a Feller Needs a Friend (1932)
Million Dollar Legs (1932) as Willie – Angela's Brother
Winner Takes All (1932) as Dickie Harmon
Hook and Ladder (1932, Short) as Dickie (as Hal Roach's Rascals)
Blonde Venus (1932) as Johnny Faraday
Free Wheeling (1932, Short) as Dickie
Deception (1932) as Dickie Allen
Birthday Blues (1932, Short) as Dickie (as Our Gang)
The Devil Is Driving (1932) as 'Buddy' Evans
The Racing Strain (1932) as Bill Westcott as a Little Boy 
A Lad an' a Lamp (1932, Short) as Dickie (as Our Gang)
Fish Hooky (1933, Short) as Dickie (as Our Gang)
Oliver Twist (1933) as Oliver Twist
Obey the Law (1933) as Dickie Chester
Forgotten Babies (1933, Short) as Dickie (as Our Gang)
Gabriel Over the White House (1933) as Jimmy Vetter
The Kid from Borneo (1933, Short) as Dickie (as Our Gang)
Mush and Milk (1933, Short) as Dickie (as Our Gang)
The Wolf Dog (1933, Serial) as Boy at Airport
Cradle Song (1933) as Alberto
Man's Castle (1933) as Joey
Gallant Lady (1933) as Deedy Lawrence
This Side of Heaven (1934) as Freddie
Upper World (1934) as Tommy Stream
In Love with Life (1934) as Laurence 'Laury' Applegate
Fifteen Wives (1934) as Young Boy
The Human Side (1934) as Bobbie Sheldon
Tomorrow's Youth (1934) as Thomas Hall Jr
The World Accuses (1934) as Tommy Weymouth
Little Men (1934) as Demi
 Swellhead (1935) as Billy Malone
Without Children  (1935) as David Sonny Cole Jr. as a Child
So Red the Rose (1935) as Middleton Bedford
Peter Ibbetson (1935) as Gogo – Peter Age 8
Timothy's Quest (1936) as Timothy
The Story of Louis Pasteur (1936) as Joseph Meister
The Little Red Schoolhouse (1936) as Dickie Burke
The Life of Emile Zola (1937) as Pierre Dreyfus
Madame X (1937) as Allan Simonds (uncredited)
The Bride Wore Red (1937) as Pietro
Love, Honor and Behave (1938) as Ted – as a child
My Bill (1938) as Bill Colbrook
The Gladiator (1938) as Bobby
The Arkansas Traveler (1938) as Benjamin Franklin 'Benny' Allen
Lincoln in the White House (1939, Short) as Tad Lincoln
The Under-Pup (1939) as Jerry Binns
Hidden Power (1939) as Stevie Garfield
The Blue Bird (1940) as Young Lad (uncredited)
A Dispatch from Reuter's (1940) as Reuter as a Boy 
The Great Mr. Nobody (1941) as 'Limpy' Barnes
Sergeant York (1941) as George York
The Adventures of Martin Eden (1942) as Johnny
Miss Annie Rooney (1942) as Marty White
Heaven Can Wait (1943) as Henry Van Cleve – Age 15 (uncredited)
Happy Land (1943) as Peter Orcutt
Jive Junction (1943) as Peter Crane
The Song of Bernadette (1943) as Adolard Bouhouhorts – Age 15 (uncredited)
The Eve of St. Mark (1944) as Zip West
Youth Runs Wild (1944) as Georgie Dunlop
Sweet and Low-Down (1944) as Military Cadet General Cramichael
Out of the Past (1947) as The Kid
Dangerous Years (1947) as Gene Spooner
16 Fathoms Deep (1948) as George
Behind Locked Doors (1948) as Jim (uncredited)
Bad Boy (1949) as Charlie
Tuna Clipper (1949) as Frankie Pereira
Captain Video and His Video Rangers (1949, TV Series) as Jeff 
Killer Shark (1950) as Jonesy
Cody of the Pony Express (1950, Serial) as Bill Cody
Lux Video Theatre (1951–1953, TV Series) as Tony/Carter Lockwood 
The Member of the Wedding (1952) as Soldier
Eight Iron Men (1952) as Pvt. Muller (final film)
Omnibus (1957, TV Series) as Lt. Gen. J.E.B. Stuart (final appearance)

References

Bibliography
 Best, Marc. Those Endearing Young Charms: Child Performers of the Screen (South Brunswick and New York: Barnes & Co., 1971), pp. 197–202.
 Dye, David. Child and Youth Actors: Filmography of Their Entire Careers, 1914–1985. Jefferson, NC: McFarland & Co., 1988, pp. 162–163.
 Holmstrom, John. The Moving Picture Boy: An International Encyclopaedia from 1895 to 1995, Norwich, Michael Russell, 1996, pp. 139–140.

External links

 
 
 
 
 Photographs and literature
 "Fun with Dick and Jane" article w/photos

1925 births
2015 deaths
American businesspeople
American male child actors
American male silent film actors
American male writers
American people of English descent
American people of Irish descent
20th-century American male actors
Male actors from Los Angeles
Hal Roach Studios actors
American male comedy actors
Our Gang
United States Army personnel of World War II